The Battle of Greenbrier River, also known as the Battle of Camp Bartow, took place on October 3, 1861 in Pocahontas County, Virginia (now West Virginia) as part of the Operations in Western Virginia Campaign during the American Civil War.

Background
In mid-September 1861 Confederate troops established Camp Bartow in the Cheat Mountain Area. The Confederates, under the command of General William B. Taliaferro, had the advantage of knowing the land but their numbers were greatly reduced due to sickness.  Taiaferro had reported that his army had been reduced to one-third strength.

Controlling the Union forces in Cheat Mountain and Tygart's Valley was General Joseph J. Reynolds. Reynolds’ army's spirits had been heartened due to their success in repelling General William W. Loring's troops. Reynolds believed that he would be able to defeat Taliaferro and clear the mountain for a quick route to Virginia. For two days it rained non-stop and due to the cold weather both troops lost men.

Opposing forces

Union
Reynolds' army was composed of: the 24th Ohio Infantry; 25th Ohio Infantry; and the 32nd Ohio Infantry; the 7th Indiana Infantry, 9th Indiana Infantry, 13th Indiana Infantry, 14th Indiana Infantry, 15th Indiana Infantry and the 17th Indiana Infantry; the 4th U.S. Light Artillery, Battery G, Cpt Albion P. Howe; Loomis' Michigan Battery; Battery "A" West Virginia Light Artillery, Captain Philip Daum; and with parts of Robinson's Ohio Cavalry; Greenfield's Pennsylvania Cavalry, and Brackens' Indiana Rangers. Reynolds had about 5,000 men of different arms, infantry, cavalry and artillery.

Confederate
Jackson's army consisted of the 1st Georgia Infantry (Ramsey's) and 12th Georgia Infantry, under command of Colonel Edward Johnson; the 23rd Virginia Infantry, 44th Virginia Infantry and a battalion of the 25th Virginia Infantry, commanded by Colonel William B. Taliaferro; 3rd Arkansas Infantry, 31st Virginia Infantry, and Lieutenant Colonel Hansbrough's battalion, under command of Colonel Albert Rust; Anderson's and Shumaker's Batteries, and a part of the Churchville Cavalry under Captain Sterrett. And about nine miles away, Colonel John B. Baldwin was stationed with the 52nd Virginia.

Battle

Reynolds troops began to move at midnight on October 2, 1861 and by daylight they entered Greenbrier, roughly four miles from the Confederate camp.

At 8 o’clock in the morning the Confederate soldiers guarding the camp left their posts and the Union soldiers entered the Confederate camp. Upon opening fire, the Confederate Army was having trouble working their weapons and while they were trying to fix them they were forced to move out into the open due to the Union armies significant firepower.

When Colonel John B. Baldwin, who was in charge of the 52nd Virginia Infantry, heard the gunshots he immediately left camp with all of his men and went to help the Confederates. By the time they reached the battlefield they thought it was too late, but when the Union army saw more men coming they continued to fire and the battle continued for approximately five more hours. Reynolds ordered his troops to return to Cheat Mountain breaking off the battle.

Aftermath
After the battle was finished, both sides realized the losses were not great. In an attempt to appear superior, both the Union and the Confederates increased the enemies losses and both reported that they had lost around 300 men. When the results were calculated the Union had eight men killed and thirty-five men wounded.  The Confederates had lost six men, had thirty-three wounded, and thirteen men missing. The result of the Battle of Greenbrier River was inconclusive.

Battlefield preservation
The Staunton-Parkersburg Turnpike Alliance  received a $46,000 grant from the National Park Service to develop community consensus and a preservation plan for the future of the Greenbrier River/Camp Bartow site.  The preservation partner will seek community support for this plan, and will address the future of the Camp Bartow Historic District.

In the fall of 2016, in conjunction with the American Battlefield Trust and its partners, the West Virginia Land Trust acquired  that preserve the core of the battlefield.  The organization plans to develop public access to the site in 2018.

See also
Bartow, West Virginia
Camp Bartow Historic District

References

 www.fsu.edu

External links
 CWSAC Report Update and Resurvey: Individual Battlefield Profiles

Western Virginia campaign
Battles of the Eastern Theater of the American Civil War
Pocahontas County, West Virginia in the American Civil War
Inconclusive battles of the American Civil War
1861 in the American Civil War
1861 in Virginia
Battles of the American Civil War in West Virginia
October 1861 events